Gilles Anthony Afoumba (born 14 June 1996) is a sprinter from the Republic of the Congo.

Afoumba competed in the Athletics at the 2020 Summer Olympics – Men's 400 metres.

References

1996 births
Living people
Athletes (track and field) at the 2020 Summer Olympics
Republic of the Congo male sprinters
African Games competitors for the Republic of the Congo
Athletes (track and field) at the 2019 African Games
Olympic athletes of the Republic of the Congo